Opinion polling for the 2019 Conservative Party leadership election had taken place since 2017. Conservative Party Leader and Prime Minister Theresa May announced on 24 May 2019 that she would resign as leader on 7 June 2019, officially announcing the start of the 2019 Conservative Party leadership election.

Polling via organisations

 Jeremy Hunt vs. Boris Johnson 

 All candidates

Head to head polling 

Davis vs Rudd

Johnson head-to-heads

Gove head-to-heads

Javid head-to-heads

Stewart head-to-heads

Hunt head-to-heads

Leadsom head-to-heads

Raab head-to-heads

Mordaunt vs Hancock

Johnson vs Rudd

Davis vs Johnson

Approval ratings of prospective candidates

Jeremy Hunt

Sajid Javid

Boris Johnson

Amber Rudd

Michael Gove

Dominic Raab

David Davis

Jacob Rees-Mogg

Andrea Leadsom

Matt Hancock

Penny Mordaunt

Rory Stewart

Kit Malthouse

Sam Gyimah

Esther McVey

Mark Harper

James Cleverly

Candidate comparison with Theresa May 
Boris Johnson

Jeremy Hunt

Leadership capabilities in a general election 
Boris Johnson

Michael Gove

Sajid Javid

Jeremy Hunt

Dominic Raab

Andrea Leadsom

Rory Stewart

Matt Hancock

Penny Mordaunt

Leadership capabilities in handling Brexit 
Boris Johnson

Michael Gove

Sajid Javid

Jeremy Hunt

Dominic Raab

Andrea Leadsom

Penny Mordaunt

Matt Hancock

Rory Stewart

Leadership strength or weakness 
Boris Johnson

Michael Gove

Sajid Javid

Jeremy Hunt

Rory Stewart

Dominic Raab

Matt Hancock

Penny Mordaunt

Andrea Leadsom

Competence and incompetence 
Boris Johnson

Michael Gove

Sajid Javid

Jeremy Hunt

Dominic Raab

Rory Stewart

Penny Mordaunt

Andrea Leadsom

Matt Hancock

Notes

References 

2019 Conservative Party (UK) leadership election
Opinion polling in the United Kingdom
Conservative Party (UK)
2019 elections in the United Kingdom
Conservative Party leadership election